Cerithiopsis iochrous is a species of sea snail, a gastropod in the family Cerithiopsidae. It was described by Jay and Drivas, in 2002.

References

iochrous
Gastropods described in 2002